The M52 is a short metropolitan route in Johannesburg, South Africa.

Route 
The M52 begins at the M14 and ends at the M39.

References 

Streets and roads of Johannesburg
Metropolitan routes in Johannesburg